Robert "Bob" Huget (May 28, 1947 – June 1, 2022) was a politician in Ontario, Canada. He was a New Democratic Party member of the Legislative Assembly of Ontario from 1990 to 1995, and served as a cabinet minister in the government of Bob Rae.

Background 
Born in Regina, Saskatchewan, Huget was involved in the labour movement, serving as president and vice-president of Energy and Chemical Workers Union Local 800, and as a representative to the Sarnia District Labour Council.

Politics 
He was elected to the Ontario legislature in the 1990 provincial election, defeating Liberal candidate Mike Bradley by over 2,000 votes in the riding of Sarnia.  He served as a parliamentary assistant from 1991 to 18 August 1994, when he was promoted to the position of minister without portfolio responsible for Economic Development and Trade.

The NDP were defeated in the 1995 provincial election, and Huget finished third in Sarnia in a close three-way race.

Later life 
After his defeat, Huget became administrative vice-president of the Communications, Energy and Paperworkers Union of Canada and chair of the Canadian Apprenticeship Forum. In 2003, he was a prominent opponent of Petro-Canada's decision to close its plant in Oakville.
Huget died June 1, 2022 in hospital in Hamilton, Ontario according to an obituary.

Electoral record

References

External links 
 

Living people
Ontario New Democratic Party MPPs
1947 births